Jhasmani Campos Dávalos (born 10 May 1988) is a Bolivian professional footballer who plays as a midfielder for Independiente Petrolero and the Bolivia national team.

Club career
He began his career at an early age with the Ramon Tahuichi Aguilera Academy. While playing at a youth football tournament in Uruguay with the academy in 2005, he was spotted by a talent scout from Brazilian club Grêmio, who brought him to Porto Alegre to join the youth team later that year. After six months of negotiations, Grêmio didn't come to a mutual agreement with Tahuichi to acquire Campos, and he returned to Bolivia in 2006. That same year, he signed with first division club Oriente Petrolero and in short time he earned his place in the starting line-up. As the season developed Campos proved to be a vital part of the team. He displayed such a great technique, that with only 18 years of age he turned into one of the most significant players in the league. In May 2009, Brazilian team Bahia was close from signing Campos, but due to some economic disparities among parts his transfer was frustrated.
Campos is currently the most expensive player in Bolivian Football where he receives $750.000. He scored a brace in Bolivar's 2-1 round of 16 victory against reigning Copa Libertadores champions Santos. In July 2013 Campos was loaned to Qatari first division club Muaither SC for one year.

International career
During 2007, Campos joined the Bolivia U-20 squad for the South American Youth Championship held in Paraguay, where he scored two goals in four games. He also received his first call-up to the senior Bolivia national team for a friendly match against South Africa on 28 March. In June of that year, he played for Bolivia in Copa América 2007, where he scored his first international goal against Peru. As of 1 June 2015, he has represented his country in 13 FIFA World Cup qualification matches.

International goals
Scores and results list Bolivia's goal tally first.

References

External links
 
 
 
 

1988 births
Living people
Sportspeople from Santa Cruz de la Sierra
Bolivian footballers
Bolivia international footballers
Association football midfielders
Oriente Petrolero players
Club Bolívar players
The Strongest players
Al-Orobah FC players
Muaither SC players
Kazma SC players
Jhasmani Campos
Real Santa Cruz players
Club Independiente Petrolero players
2007 Copa América players
2011 Copa América players
2015 Copa América players
Copa América Centenario players
Expatriate footballers in Qatar
Expatriate footballers in Saudi Arabia
Expatriate footballers in Kuwait
Expatriate footballers in Thailand
Qatar Stars League players
Saudi Professional League players
Bolivian expatriate sportspeople in Thailand
Bolivian expatriate sportspeople in Kuwait
Kuwait Premier League players
Bolivian expatriate sportspeople in Saudi Arabia
Bolivian expatriate sportspeople in Qatar